Kristie Ahn was the defending champion, but retired in the first round against Kurumi Nara.

Whitney Osuigwe won the title, defeating Beatriz Haddad Maia in the final, 6–3, 6–4.

Seeds

Draw

Finals

Top half

Bottom half

References
Main Draw

RBC Pro Challenge - Singles